Montechiaro d'Asti (Piedmontese: Monciàir) is a town and comune (municipality) in the Province of Asti in the Italian region Piedmont, located about  east of Turin and about  northwest of Asti.

Montechiaro d'Asti borders the following municipalities: Camerano Casasco, Chiusano d'Asti, Cortanze, Cossombrato, Cunico, Montiglio Monferrato, Soglio, and Villa San Secondo.

Montechiaro is home to a notable example of Romanesque architecture in the Lower Montferrat, the church of St. Nazarius and Celsus (11th and 12th centuries).
In Montechiaro is based ACS Cycling Chirio–Casa Giani, a professional cycling team based.

Notable people
 Ezio Borgo (1922-2006), football player
 Giovanni Pastrone, also known as Piero Fosco (1883–1959), pioneer of Italian film.

Twin towns
 Finale Ligure, Italy

References

External links
 Tourism websites